Hans Dobida (born 13 May 1929) is an Austrian former ice hockey and roller in-line hockey administrator. He was involved with ATSE Graz for almost 40 years, and served as president of the Austrian Ice Hockey Association from 1977 to 1996. He helped organize hosting duties for Austria in ice hockey at the Olympic Games, and the Ice Hockey World Championships. He was a member of the International Ice Hockey Federation council from 1986 to 2008, oversaw the IIHF Continental Cup, and was part of the IIHF Inline Hockey World Championship committee. He was inducted into the IIHF Hall of Fame, the German Ice Hockey Hall of Fame, the Slovenian Hockey Hall of Fame; and received the Decoration of Honour for Services to the Republic of Austria.

Early life
Dobida was born 13 May 1929, in Graz, Austria. As a youth in Graz, he played both ice hockey and handball. He played hockey with ATSE Graz for five seasons as a young adult, then later served as head of section at ATSE Graz for almost 40 years. During this time, the club was the Austrian Hockey League champion in 1975 and 1978. He remains in an advisory role with ATSE Graz as of 2019.

Austrian Ice Hockey Association
Dobida became vice-president of the Austrian Ice Hockey Association in 1962, then took over as its president in 1977, when Walter Wasservogel moved on to international ice hockey. During this time, he served on the organizing committees for the 1964 Winter Olympics and the 1976 Winter Olympics; the 1967 World Ice Hockey Championships, the 1973 Ice Hockey World Championships Group B, the 1977 World Ice Hockey Championships, the 1987 Ice Hockey World Championships and the 1996 Men's World Ice Hockey Championships. He was proud of the 1973 event for which all games involving the Austria men's national ice hockey team were sold out, and an over-capacity crowd in the final at Eisstadion Liebenau. He welcomed a new branch into the national association in 1994, when the Lower Austrian Ice Hockey Association separated from the Vienna branch. He retired as president of the Austrian Ice Hockey Association in 1996, and was succeeded by Dieter Kalt Sr.

International Ice Hockey Federation
Dobida began in international hockey in 1977, as the delegate from the Austrian Ice Hockey Association to the International Ice Hockey Federation (IIHF). He later served on the IIHF council from 1986 to 2008, and was its treasurer from 1998 to 2008. He also served as an IIHF auditor, and participated in its strategic consulting group. He acted as chairman of approximately 50 tournaments including the Ice Hockey World Championships, and served as chairman of the IIHF Continental Cup until 2018. He was chairman of the 2008 IIHF Inline Hockey World Championship committee in Bratislava. He stated that the IIHF's roller in-line hockey program provided development opportunities for IIHF members, and has grown in popularity and credibility with organizational support from Walter Bush, and the participation of former National Hockey League players.

Honors and awards
Dobida was named an honorary president of the Austrian Ice Hockey Association on 29 June 1996. He was inducted into the German Ice Hockey Hall of Fame in 2004, and into the Slovenian Hockey Hall of Fame in the inaugural class of 2007. He was inducted into the IIHF Hall of Fame in 2007, in the builder category. The induction ceremony took place at the 2007 IIHF World Championship in Moscow. He was later made a life member of the IIHF in 2008. He was given the Panathlon International Award in 2011, as a founding member of Club Graz. He is also an honorary member of the Austrian Olympic Committee, and is a recipient of the "Gold Medal" class of the Decoration of Honour for Services to the Republic of Austria.

References

1929 births
Living people
Auditors
Austrian ice hockey administrators
Austrian ice hockey players
Austrian male handball players
IIHF Continental Cup
Inline hockey administrators
International Ice Hockey Federation executives
IIHF Hall of Fame inductees
Olympic officials
Recipients of the Decoration of Honour for Services to the Republic of Austria
Sportspeople from Graz